UFC Fight Night: Sanchez vs. Parisyan (also known as UFC Fight Night 6) was a mixed martial arts event held by the Ultimate Fighting Championship on August 17, 2006. The event took place at the Red Rock Resort Spa and Casino in Las Vegas, Nevada, and was broadcast live on Spike TV in the United States and Canada.  It acted as a lead-in to the season four premiere of The Ultimate Fighter.  The two-hour broadcast of UFC Fight Night 6 on Spike TV drew a 1.5 overall rating.

The main event of the evening – a welterweight bout between The Ultimate Fighter superstar Diego Sanchez and former title contender Karo Parisyan – was given heightened interest, as the winner of the bout was rumored to designate the next challenger for the UFC welterweight championship. 

The disclosed fighter payroll for this event was $173,500.

Results

Bonus awards
Fight of the Night: Diego Sanchez vs. Karo Parisyan
Knockout of the Night: Chris Leben
Submission of the Night: Joe Riggs

Reported Payouts

Diego Sanchez: $32,000

Joe Riggs: $24,000

Dean Lister: $16,000

Josh Koscheck: $14,000

Chris Leben: $14,000

Karo Parisyan: $12,000

Anthony Torres: $10,000

Martin Kampmann: $10,000

Jonathan Goulet: $6,500

Jake O’Brien: $6,000

Jason Von Flue: $5,000

Yuki Sasaki: $5,000

Sam Morgan: $4,000

''Jorge Santiago: $4,000Forrest Petz: $4,000Crafton Wallace: $3,000

Kristof Midoux: $2,000

Pat Healy: $2,000

Disclosed Fighter Payroll: $173,500

See also
 Ultimate Fighting Championship
 List of UFC champions
 List of UFC events
 2006 in UFC

References

External links
UFC Fight Night Results on Sherdog
UFC Fight Night 6 Ratings Up Slightly from UFN 5
UFC Fight Night 6 Fighter Salary Breakdown
UFC Fight Night 6 Resultats UFC Fans

UFC Fight Night
2006 in mixed martial arts
Mixed martial arts in Las Vegas
2006 in sports in Nevada